T. Henry Wilson Jr. Field is a baseball venue located in Davidson, North Carolina, United States.  It is home to the Davidson Wildcats baseball team, a member of the Division I Atlantic-10 Conference.  It has a capacity of 700 spectators.

The field opened in 1967 as Wildcat Park, with the first game being held on March 19, 1967.  On March 19, 2005, the venue was renamed after T. Henry Wilson Jr., class of 1951.  Wilson played both baseball and football at Davidson, and a donation by his family made significant renovations to the field possible.

In 2003, lights were installed at the facility, allowing the first night games to be played at then-Wildcat Park.  In 2005, after a donation from the Wilson family, new bleachers, infield, concession stands, and a press box were added.  In 2009, an indoor practice facility outside the field was completed.

See also
 List of NCAA Division I baseball venues

References

Davidson Wildcats baseball
College baseball venues in the United States
Baseball venues in North Carolina
Sports venues in Mecklenburg County, North Carolina
1967 establishments in North Carolina
Sports venues completed in 1967